A Guest of Honour is a 1970 fictional novel by Nobel winning South African writer Nadine Gordimer. Published four years after her novel The Late Bourgeois World, the novel is a political novel that explores the role of revolutionary ideas in new African states.

Critical reception 
The New York Times reviewer Thomas Fisk called the novel "a long, spacious, comprehensive work of fiction" which has "something Olympian, something magnificently confident [about how] this South African writer goes about her work." Fisk's review focuses on the stylistic qualities of the novel, calling the characters "exceedingly human: complicated, erring, driven by fleshy appetites and by the loftiest resolves" and discussing the setting as a "landscape so tactile and so sensuous that it becomes a participant in everything that occurs".

References

Further reading 

Novels by Nadine Gordimer
20th-century South African novels
1970 novels